John Elbridge Hudson (August 3, 1839 – October 1, 1900) was an American lawyer, telephone businessman, and president of AT&T from 1889 to 1900.

Early life
Hudson was born in Lynn, Massachusetts to John Hudson and Elizabeth C. (née Hilliard) Hudson.

He made Bachelor of Arts at Harvard College in 1862 as valedictorian. He made Bachelor of Laws in 1865 and was admitted to the bar the following year.

Career
After admission to the bar, Hudson joined the Boston law firm Chandler, Shattuck & Thayer, where he became partner in 1870.

In 1878, the firm dissolved, and he became counsel for the American Bell Telephone Company in 1880, later known as AT&T. He became solicitor, vice president on November 29, 1886, and president on April 1, 1889.

Hudson was involved with numerous organizations and learned societies throughout his life, including the American Academy of Arts and Sciences, the corporation of the Massachusetts Institute of Technology, the British Association for the Advancement of Science, the New England Historic Genealogical Society (where he became vice-president), the Colonial Society of Massachusetts, the Bostonian Society, the Lynn Historical Society, the American Institute of Electrical Engineers, the Boston Bar Association, the Virginia Historical Society, and he was elected a member of the American Antiquarian Society in April 1894.

Personal life
Hudson married Eunice Healey, daughter of Wells and Elizabeth (née Pickering) Healey, from Hampton Falls, New Hampshire, on August 23, 1871.

Hudson died on October 1, 1900 in Beverly, Massachusetts.

Further reading
 Memoir of John Elbridge Hudson by Francis Blake (1900)

References

External links
 Biography
 The Saugus Iron Works at Lynn, Mass. : addresses at the presentation to the city of Lynn of the first casting made in America (1892) by Hudson and C.G.H. Woodbury (at the Internet Archive)

1839 births
1900 deaths
Harvard College alumni
People from Lynn, Massachusetts
Members of the American Antiquarian Society
19th-century American businesspeople
AT&T people